Andrea Cardona (born June 19, 1982) is a Guatemalan mountaineer, the first Central American woman and the Caribbean to reach the world's highest peak on Mount Everest,  above sea level, and the first Latin American to complete the Adventurers Grand Slam.

Early life 
Andrea Melissa Cardona Morfín was born in Guatemala City.

At age 18, inclined to engage in the Tourism Industry, she applied for a scholarship at the University of Genoa in Italy and four years later graduated from Tourism Economics. She later worked for a hotel chain in Sardinia and then in New York City, performing desk job in the marketing area.

Andrea applied for a job as a guide, which she found with a Brazilian tour operator based in Asia. After making seven trekking to the base camp of Mount Everest and discovering an innate passion for mountaineering, proposed to challenge herself as being "the first Central American woman to climb the highest peaks on earth"

Among her main achievements and challenges are "The seven highest peaks on each continent", "The Three Poles Challenge Planet" and "Explorers Grand Slam".

Three Poles Challenge 

On May 23, 2010 Andrea Cardona became the first Central American woman to climb Mount Everest, the highest peak in the world and the so-called Third Pole of the Planet, being the third largest ice storage of the globe.

Subsequently, on December 28, 2011, began a new challenge in Antarctica after having skied 111.11 kilometers (equivalent to a terrestrial latitude) in a week, a woman got placed for the first time in history, the flag of Guatemala at the geographic South Pole.

On Tuesday, April 17, 2012, ended the challenge of the three poles of the planet, skiing 111.11 kilometers again, this time to the geographic north pole, which is located in the Arctic Ocean.

Thus Andrea Cardona carried the flag of Guatemala to a new record by becoming the first Latin American woman to accomplish this feat.

Adventurers Grand Slam 

The Explorers Grand Slam or Adventurers Grand Slam is an adventurer's challenge to reach the North Pole, the South Pole, and all of the Seven Summits.

Some 28 people have completed the Explorers Grand Slam.

References

External links 
 

1982 births
Living people
Guatemalan mountain climbers
Guatemalan sportswomen
Summiters of the Seven Summits
Female climbers